Jørgen Jensen may refer to:
Jørgen Jensen (equestrian) (1878–1970), Norwegian military officer, equestrian, and equestrian
Jørgen Jensen (soldier) (1891–1922), Danish-born Australian recipient of the Victoria Cross
Jørgen Jensen (wrestler) (1939-1995), Danish Olympic wrestler
Jørgen Jensen (runner) (1944–2009), long-distance runner from Denmark
Jørgen Jensen (cyclist) (1947–2015), Danish Olympic cyclist
Jørgen Juul Jensen

See also
Jensen (surname)